Permission to Evaporate is a studio album by Australian, multi-instrumentalist and oud virtuoso Joseph Tawadros. The album was self-released in May 2014.

At the ARIA Music Awards of 2014, the album won the ARIA Award for Best World Music Album It was Tawadros third win in this category.

At the AIR Awards of 2014, the album was nominated for Best Independent Jazz Album Album.

Reception
Peter Winkler from The Music Trust said "This album is a wondrous ride through Tawadros's vivid musical imagination, accompanied by some of the most outstanding players in the world"

Track listing
 "Bluegrass Nikriz" - 6:35
 "Permission to Evaporate" - 5:36
 "Sleight of Hand" - 5:16
 "Space in Time" - 2:51
 "Peace for My Father" - 5:49
 "Constantinople" - 7:00
 "Nomad's Fear" - 2:45
 "Dreaming Hermit" - 6:17
 "Last Candle" - 4:53
 "Eye of the Beholder" - 5:13
 "Wanderer" - 2:22
 "Leunig at Midnight" - 4:04
 "Kindred Spirits" - 6:23
 "Point of Departure" - 4:28
 "Shared Memories" - 4:07
 "A Tear On Faewell" - 5:36

 All songs written and composed by Joseph Tawadros

Personnel
 Joseph Tawadros (Oud)
 Christian McBride (Double Bass)
 Matt McMahon (Piano)
 Mike Stern (Electric Guitar)
 James Tawadros (Req & Bendir)

References 

2014 albums
Joseph Tawadros albums
ARIA Award-winning albums